An annular solar eclipse occurred on July 10, 1907. A solar eclipse occurs when the Moon passes between Earth and the Sun, thereby totally or partly obscuring the image of the Sun for a viewer on Earth. An annular solar eclipse occurs when the Moon's apparent diameter is smaller than the Sun's, blocking most of the Sun's light and causing the Sun to look like an annulus (ring). An annular eclipse appears as a partial eclipse over a region of the Earth thousands of kilometres wide. Annularity was visible from Chile, Bolivia including its capital Sucre, and Brazil. The green line means eclipse begins or ends at sunrise or sunset. The magenta line means mid eclipse at sunrise or sunset, or northern or southern penumbra limits. The green point means eclipse obscuration of 50%. The red line means antumbral northern and southern limits.

Related eclipses

Solar eclipses 1906–1909

Saros 125

Inex series

Notes

References 

1907 7 10
1907 7 10
1907 in science
July 1907 events